Cricoidoscelosus is an extinct genus of crayfish discovered in the Yixian Formation in China, with only the type species, C. aethus, known, that may be one of, if not, the oldest known fossil crayfish to date. 

Cricoidoscelosus was initially believed to be Late Jurassic (Tithonian) in age, but it is now confirmed to have been Early Cretaceous (Barremian-Aptian) in age.

Taxonomy

"Mongolarachne" chaoyangensis 
In 2019, a supposed new species of the spider Mongolarachne, "Mongolarachne" chaoyangensis was described from the Yixian Formation in China. However, in a later publication that same year, when the specimen was subject to fluorescence microscopy, it was shown that the specimen was a forgery using a fossil of Cricoidoscelosus as a base, that had been painted to look like a spider, and as such the species was a junior synonym of Cricoidoscelosus.

References 

Fossil taxa described in 1999
Crayfish
Barremian genus first appearances